Jesper Tjäder (born 22 May 1994) is a Swedish freestyle skier. He won the overall slopestyle World Cup in 2014, and competed for Sweden at the 2014, 2018, and 2022 Winter Olympics; winning a Bronze medal in Slopestyle at the latter

Personal life
Tjäder was born in Östersund, Sweden, on 22 May 1994. His parents introduced him to skiing at the age of three.

Career
Tjäder competed in slopestyle at the FIS Freestyle World Ski Championships 2013, and he represented Sweden in slopestyle at the 2014 Winter Olympics in Sochi, where he finished 24th. At the 2013–14 FIS Freestyle Skiing World Cup, Tjäder won the overall slopestyle cup and placed third overall. Tjäder returned to the Winter Olympics for 2018 in PyeongChang, where he placed 23rd in the slopestyle competition. Tjäder again returned to the Winter Olympics for 2022 in Beijing, where he placed 3rd and secured a bronze medal in the slopestyle competition.

Tjäder progressed freeskiing by innovating tricks and building never-seen-before rails.

Tjäder currently holds the world record for the longest rail slide on skis.

References

External links

1994 births
Living people
People from Östersund
Freestyle skiers at the 2014 Winter Olympics
Freestyle skiers at the 2018 Winter Olympics
Freestyle skiers at the 2022 Winter Olympics
Swedish male freestyle skiers
Olympic freestyle skiers of Sweden
X Games athletes
Olympic medalists in freestyle skiing
Olympic bronze medalists for Sweden
Medalists at the 2022 Winter Olympics
Sportspeople from Jämtland County
21st-century Swedish people